Paradise is the second studio album by English folk pop duo Slow Club. It was released on 12 September 2011, on independent record label Moshi Moshi Records. The record was produced by Luke Smith, former member of Clor and producer of Foals' Mercury-nominated Total Life Forever. The album received "universal acclaim" according to review aggregator Metacritic, and peaked at number 70 on the United Kingdom Albums Chart. The songs "Two Cousins" and "Where I'm Waking" were released as singles leading up to the album's release. The next single to be released was "Beginners", whose video features Harry Potter film star Daniel Radcliffe. The video for "Beginners" was filmed in the Faltering Fullback, a pub in Finsbury Park in London, and was shot in a single take.

Track listing

The track "Horses Jumping" has a hidden track on the end called "Paradise".

Reception

Critical response

The album has received widespread critical acclaim from critics. On Metacritic, a website which assigns a normalised rating out of 100 from reviews by mainstream critics, it currently holds a rating of 81/100, signifying Universal Acclaim.

References

2011 albums
Slow Club albums
Moshi Moshi Records albums